Pseudozizeeria maha, the pale grass blue, is a small butterfly found in South Asia that belongs to the lycaenids or blues family. The species was first described by Vincenz Kollar in 1844.

Subspecies
The subspecies of Pseudozizeeria maha are-

 Pseudozizeeria maha maha Kollar, 1844 – Pakistan, north and northeast India, Indochina
 Pseudozizeeria maha ossa Swinhoe, 1885 – south India
 Pseudozizeeria maha okinawana (Matsumura, 1929) – Okinawa
 Pseudozizeeria maha diluta (C. Felder & R. Felder, [1865]) – Yunnan
 Pseudozizeeria maha saishutonis (Matsumura, 1927) – Korea
 Pseudozizeeria maha argia (Ménétriès, 1857) – Japan

Description

Wet-season brood
 
Male. Upperside silvery light blue with a satiny sheen in certain lights. Forewing: the apical half of the costa narrowly and the terminal margin for varying widths fuscous black, bounded outwardly on the latter by an obscure anteciliary black line. Hindwing: the costa broadly, the termen somewhat more narrowly fuscous black as in the forewing, with the width of this dark edging similarly variable; in addition there is a very diffuse and ill-defined subterminal series of spots darker than the fuscous margin. Underside: brownish grey. Forewing: a spot in cell, a transverse lunule on the discocellulars, and a transverse anteriorly inwardly curved series of eight discal spots, black; the transverse lunule and each spot encircled with a narrow white edging; the posterior two spots of the discal series geminate (paired). Beyond these are a postdiscal and a subterminal series of short transverse dusky black spots followed by an anteciliary black line; the ground colour between the discal and postdiscal series and between the latter and the subterminal series of spots posteriorly paler than on the rest of the wing. Hindwing: a transverse, subbasal, slightly sinuate line of four spots, a short, slender, lunular line on the discocellulars, and a very strongly curved discal series of eight small spots, black; the lunule and each spot encircled with a narrow edging of white; the posterior two spots of the discal series geminate as on the forewing; beyond these as on the forewing there is a double line of dusky spots, only more lunular, with between them and between the discal and postdiscal series the ground colour in the same way followed by slightly paler; an anteciliary fine black line. Cilia of both forewings and hindwings whitey brown, darker anteriorly on the forewing. Antennae, head, thorax and abdomen dark brown, shafts of the antennae ringed with white; in fresh specimens the thorax and abdomen with a little light blue pubescence; beneath: palpi, thorax and abdomen white.

Female upperside: brownish black; the basal halves of the wings slightly suffused with light blue, anteciliary black lines on both forewings and hindwings, and on the latter wing an obscure subterminal series of spots as in the male. Underside, similar, only the ground colour darker, the markings larger and more clearly defined. Antennae, head, thorax and abdomen as in the male, but with no blue pubescence on the thorax and abdomen on the upperside.

Dry-season brood

Male upperside: pale bluish grey with, in some specimens, a pinkish undertone. Forewing: as in the wet-season brood, but the black terminal edging much reduced in width in some specimens to a transverse, somewhat diffuse, very narrow band that borders the anteciliary black line on the inner side, in others to a much broader similar band that coalesces with the anteciliary black line and occupies about the outer sixth of the wing. This edging along the termen is sometimes even, sometimes it widens from a slender anteciliary at and above the tornus to a broad black patch at the apex of the wing.

Hindwing: the terminal black edging much narrower proportionately than in wet-season specimens, most often reduced to a slender black anteciliary line with a series of black spots on the inner side, bordering and sometimes coalescing with the line. Underside: as in the wet-season brood but the ground colour paler, in some specimens much paler, the markings on both forewings and hindwings similar, with frequently the terminal markings obsolescent, sometimes entirely absent or only indicated anteriorly on each wing. Cilia whitish. Antennae, head, thorax, and abdomen as in the wet-season specimens.

Female similar to the female of the wet-season brood, but more like the male, with the light silvery-blue suffusion very irregular, but generally extended much further outwards from the base. Underside: as in the male, the ground colour slightly darker. Other variations exist:

Antenna, head, thorax and abdomen similar to those of the male.

Food plants
The eggs are laid on the host plants and the larvae hatch to feed on them. The plants include members of the Oxalidaceae including Oxalis corniculata, some Leguminosae and Acanthaceae.

Other studies
A study in Japan used this species to detect the side-effects of transgenic Bt corn, particularly by way of pollen falling onto leaves of the Oxalis host plants. No significant effect was found in that study.

Other Japanese studies showed increased abnormalities in individuals of this species subjected to radiation following the Fukushima Daiichi nuclear disaster. Additionally, there are different studies on the recent migrations of the species to northern climates, where cold habitat leads to the increase of modifications of wing color pattern, found in northern margin populations of Japan.

In popular culture
The eighth studio album (Dark Sky Island) of Irish singer-songwriter Enya featured the song "Pale Grass Blue", inspired by the butterfly.

Gallery

See also
List of butterflies of India (Lycaenidae)

References

General reading
 
 
 
 
 
 

Polyommatini
Butterflies of Asia
Butterflies of Singapore
Butterflies described in 1848